

Roster

Regular season

Season standings

Record vs. opponents

Game log

Playoffs

|- align="center" bgcolor="#ccffcc"
| 1
| April 1
| St. Louis
| W 129–106
| Jerry West (28)
| Elgin Baylor (15)
| Jerry West (12)
| Los Angeles Memorial Sports Arena11,509
| 1–0
|- align="center" bgcolor="#ccffcc"
| 2
| April 3
| St. Louis
| W 125–116
| Elgin Baylor (42)
| Elgin Baylor (14)
| Elgin Baylor (9)
| Los Angeles Memorial Sports Arena14,896
| 2–0
|- align="center" bgcolor="#ffcccc"
| 3
| April 6
| @ St. Louis
| L 113–120
| Jerry West (32)
| Jerry West (11)
| Jerry West (8)
| Kiel Auditorium8,318
| 2–1
|- align="center" bgcolor="#ccffcc"
| 4
| April 9
| @ St. Louis
| W 107–95
| Jerry West (42)
| Elgin Baylor (13)
| three players tied (4)
| Kiel Auditorium9,569
| 3–1
|- align="center" bgcolor="#ffcccc"
| 5
| April 10
| St. Louis
| L 100–112
| Jerry West (31)
| Elgin Baylor (17)
| Elgin Baylor (4)
| Los Angeles Memorial Sports Arena14,297
| 3–2
|- align="center" bgcolor="#ffcccc"
| 6
| April 13
| @ St. Louis
| L 131–127
| Jerry West (38)
| Elgin Baylor (13)
| West, Hazzard (5)
| Kiel Auditorium8,614
| 3–3
|- align="center" bgcolor="#ccffcc"
| 7
| April 15
| St. Louis
| W 130–121
| Jerry West (35)
| Elgin Baylor (11)
| Baylor, LaRusso (7)
| Los Angeles Memorial Sports Arena15,200
| 4–3
|-

|- align="center" bgcolor="#ccffcc"
| 1
| April 17
| @ Boston
| W 133–129 (OT)
| Jerry West (41)
| Elgin Baylor (20)
| Gail Goodrich (5)
| Boston Garden13,909
| 1–0
|- align="center" bgcolor="#ffcccc"
| 2
| April 19
| @ Boston
| L 109–129
| Jerry West (18)
| Elgin Baylor (14)
| Walt Hazzard (5)
| Boston Garden13,909
| 1–1
|- align="center" bgcolor="#ffcccc"
| 3
| April 20
| Boston
| L 106–120
| Jerry West (34)
| Elgin Baylor (15)
| Jim King (6)
| Los Angeles Memorial Sports Arena15,101
| 1–2
|- align="center" bgcolor="#ffcccc"
| 4
| April 22
| Boston
| L 117–122
| Jerry West (45)
| Elgin Baylor (12)
| Jerry West (10)
| Los Angeles Memorial Sports Arena15,251
| 1–3
|- align="center" bgcolor="#ccffcc"
| 5
| April 24
| @ Boston
| W 121–117
| Elgin Baylor (41)
| Elgin Baylor (16)
| Jerry West (5)
| Boston Garden13,909
| 2–3
|- align="center" bgcolor="#ccffcc"
| 6
| April 26
| Boston
| W 123–115
| Jerry West (32)
| Elgin Baylor (14)
| Jerry West (7)
| Los Angeles Memorial Sports Arena15,069
| 3–3
|- align="center" bgcolor="#ffcccc"
| 7
| April 28
| @ Boston
| L 93–95
| Jerry West (36)
| Elgin Baylor (14)
| West, Hazzard (3)
| Boston Garden13,909
| 3–4
|-

Awards and records

Awards
 Jerry West, All-NBA First Team
 Jerry West, NBA All-Star Game
 Rudy LaRusso, NBA All-Star Game

References
1965–66 Los Angeles Lakers roster, statistics, and box scores
1965-66 Season - All Things Lakers

Los Angeles Lakers seasons
Los Angeles Lakers
Los Angle
Los Angle